is a compilation album by Japanese entertainer Noriko Sakai. Released through Victor Entertainment on September 21, 2016, to celebrate Sakai's 30th anniversary, the album compiles 30 songs selected by her fans on an online poll, along with Chinese-language versions of "Yume Bōken" and "Aoi Usagi". Also included is a 60-page photo booklet.

The album peaked at No. 75 on Oricon's albums chart.

Track listing

Charts

References

External links
 
 

2016 compilation albums
Japanese-language compilation albums
Victor Entertainment compilation albums